The 1940 Grand National was the 99th renewal of the Grand National horse race that took place at Aintree near Liverpool, England, on 5 April 1940.

Thirty horses ran in the steeplechase, which was won by Bogskar, a 25/1 shot ridden by Royal Air Force sergeant Mervyn Jones. MacMoffat finished in second place, Gold Arrow was third, and Symaethis fourth.

It was the last true Aintree Grand National before a five-year break due to World War II.

Finishing order

Non-finishers

References

 1940
Grand National
Grand National
20th century in Lancashire
April 1940 sports events